Sea of Dreams was Nelson Riddle’s fifth studio album, released in March 1958.

Conception

The inspiration for Nelson Riddle’s conception of the theme of “Sea of Dreams” was the setting of his California home on the shoreline of the Pacific Ocean. A departure from his previous albums that were composed of arrangements characterized as bright and danceable, “Sea of Dreams” consists of music said to be “especially moving and romantic,” performed by a large string orchestra.

“Sea of Dreams” was Riddle's first stereophonic recording. The stereo version of the album was released in August 1958.

Reception

Cash Box said Riddle takes “the listener on a slow mood excursion,” with “a lush string treatment to a dozen romantic selections.” 

One reviewer observed that “Sea of Dreams” fell on “the romantic side of the Exotica genre.” “Instead of interweaving exotic percussion with the surroundings, Riddle concentrates exclusively on the strings, leaving a small niche for mallet instruments and bells of all kinds.”

Track listing

Side 1

’’Out of the Night’’ (Harry Sosnik, Walter Hirsch)
’’My Isle of Golden Dreams’’ (Gus Kahn, Walter Blaufuss)
’’Tangi Tahiti (The Call Of Tahiti’’) (Leon Pober)
’’Dream’’ (Johnny Mercer)
’’There's No You’’ (George Durgom, Hal Hopper, Tom Adair)
’’Drifting and Dreaming’’ (Egbert Van Alstyne, Erwin Schmidt, Haven Gillespie, Loyal Curtis)

Side 2

”Easter Isle’’ (Lee Gillette, Nelson Riddle)
”Let's Fall In Love’’ (Harold Arlen, Ted Koehler)
”Polka Dots And Moonbeams’’ (James Van Heusen, Johnny Burke)
”Put Your Dreams Away (For Another Day)" (Mann, Ruth Lowe, Weiss)
”Autumn Leaves’’ (Jacques Prevert, Johnny Mercer, Joseph Kosma)
”Sea of Dreams’’ (Nelson Riddle)

References

1958 albums
Nelson Riddle albums
Capitol Records albums
Instrumental albums